The following is a list of Middlesbrough managers, starting from the time when Middlesbrough F.C. turned professional in 1899 until the present.

From 1876 to 1899, the team was managed by a secretary. The most successful person to manage the club was Steve McClaren, who won the Football League Cup in 2004, the only major trophy in the club's history. Until the appointment of Aitor Karanka in November 2013 all of Middlesbrough's managers had been born in either England or Scotland.

Middlesbrough managers have retained the position an average of four years over the club's history. Since Steve Gibson's takeover as chairman in 1994, the managers initially lasted longer than the average time as he showed patience with them, allowing them time to accomplish what they wish to with the squad, but since 2009 managers have lasted less than the average time.

Managers

n/a Information not available
Information correct as of 16 February 2023. Only competitive matches are counted

Footnotes

References

External links
Middlesbrough's official website

Managers
 
Middlesbrough